Waxworks: Some Singles 1977–1982 is the first compilation album by English rock band XTC, released in November 1982 by Virgin Records. Though it followed closely on the heels of the successful English Settlement album and its lead-off single "Senses Working Overtime", it failed to crack the Top 40 perhaps signalling their commercial decline in Britain.  All twelve tracks appear on the first disc of 1996's Fossil Fuel: The XTC Singles 1977-1992.  It was initially released shrinkwrapped with the Beeswax: Some B-Sides 1977-1982 included as a "free bonus album".

Critical reception
In a retrospective review for AllMusic, Chris Woodstra wrote that though Waxworks: Some Singles 1977–1982 has been replaced by more comprehensive XTC compilation albums later on, it "remains the classic compilation of the band's first, pre-studio-bound period."

Track listing

Notes
Track 3 originally from White Music. It was rerecorded for the single release.
Single versions/edits are used throughout (as opposed to the versions appearing on the respective albums).

Personnel
XTC
Andy Partridge – guitar, vocals
Colin Moulding – bass, vocals
Barry Andrews – keyboards (1-4)
Terry Chambers – drums
Dave Gregory – guitar, keyboards (5-12)

Technical
John Leckie – producer (1, 2)
Robert John "Mutt" Lange – producer (3)
Martin Rushent – producer (4)
Steve Lillywhite – producer (5, 6, 8-10)
Phil Wainman – producer (7)
Hugh Padgham – producer (11, 12)
XTC – producer (11, 12)
Tony Cousins – mastering

Charts

References

XTC compilation albums
1982 compilation albums
Virgin Records compilation albums
1982 greatest hits albums